Luigi Facelli (10 May 1898 – 4 May 1991) was an Italian hurdler. He was born in Acqui Terme, in Piedmont, and died in Milan at the age of 92.

He was one of Italy's greatest hurdlers. He was particularly known for rivalry with the British champion David Burghley in the 1920s and 1930s.

Biography

Olympic appearances
Luigi Facelli participated at four Summer Olympics (1924, 1928, 1932, 1936). He finished 8th at the 1924 Summer Olympics in the 4x400 metres relay, 6th at the 1928 Summer Olympics in the 400 metres hurdles and 5th and 6th at the 1932 Summer Olympics respectively in the 400 metres hurdles and in the 4x400 metres relay. He had 30 caps in national team from 1924 to 1936.

Facelli-Burghley rivalry

During his rivalry with David Cecil, 6th Marquess of Exeter (Lord David Burghley), won 6 of the 11 contests. Because of the noble origins of Burghley their epic was renamed "The Prince and the Pauper." As part of the AAA Championships (which were considered a kind of European Athletics Championships at the time) he won three of the five contests against Burghley.

Despite their different walks of life, Lord Burghley considered Facelli a friend for years. Burghley invited him to the opening ceremony for the 1948 Summer Olympics in London. When Facelli received the letter he passed it to a friend to translate. However, the friend was unable to translate the whole later and the invitation was missed. Burghley also explained in the letter that Facelli would find a plane ticket to London at the British Consulate in Milan and also arranged accommodation for him London -  but all this was "lost in translation".

European record
Facelli set a European record in the 400 metres hurdles with the time of 52.4, set in Bologna, Italy on 6 October 1929. He was holder of the record till 9 July 1939.

Post athletics career
In honour of his sporting successes, the Italian government assigned to him an annual sum following a decision by the Council of Ministers (Legge Bacchelli). In 1988, on the occasion of his ninetieth birthday, the Italian designer Ottavio Missoni gave a party in his honor. Facelli resided in Corsico, and died in a clinic in Milan in 1991 at the age of 93 years.

Achievements

National titles
Luigi Facelli won 17 competitions in the Italian national championship for athletics.
11 wins on 400 metres hurdles (1924, 1925, 1926, 1927, 1928, 1929, 1930, 1931, 1935, 1936, 1938)
2 wins on 400 metres (1926, 1930)
2 wins on 110 metres hurdles (1930, 1931)
2 wins on Triple jump (1923, 1929)

See also
 Italy national relay team

References

External links
 
 Luigi Facelli in European historic newspapers

1898 births
1991 deaths
Italian male hurdlers
Athletes (track and field) at the 1924 Summer Olympics
Athletes (track and field) at the 1928 Summer Olympics
Athletes (track and field) at the 1932 Summer Olympics
Athletes (track and field) at the 1936 Summer Olympics
Olympic athletes of Italy
Athletes from Milan
Italian Athletics Championships winners